The Clarión wren (Troglodytes tanneri) is a species of bird in the family Troglodytidae. It is endemic to Clarión Island off Pacific Mexico.

It looks much like a house wren but is larger with a prominently longer bill, somewhat approaching the Carolina wren in form.

Its natural habitats are the less arid patches of shrubland, notably thickets of Ipomoea halierca morning glory. It also appears to occur in the garrison buildings and garden at Sulfur Bay, but usually avoids the rocky shores and other exposed areas. In dense undergrowth, territories are some 10 meters (30–40 ft) in diameter.

In late March 1953, males were found to be singing and threatening intruding competitors. Egg laying takes place between mid-March and mid-April.

The eggs are similar to those of the house wren, but larger and more elongated. They measure approximately 20×14 mm and also are colored basically like those of house wrens but with fewer and crisper markings noticeably denser at the blunt end.

References

Clarión wren
Natural history of the Revillagigedo Islands
Endemic birds of Western Mexico
Clarión wren
Clarión wren
Taxonomy articles created by Polbot